Brendan Connor is a Canadian journalist with a wide range of broadcasting experience, including recently working for Al Jazeera English TV, based out of Washington, D.C., and Doha, Qatar.  He is currently a news anchor and producer at CTV Northern Ontario  in Sudbury, Ontario, where he was born and raised. His father, Michael Connor, was a longtime TV news anchor for the same station.

Connor attended Queen's University, where he became involved with broadcasting at CKLC radio, a local Kingston station. He is a veteran broadcaster with over 25 years of experience including roles in sports and news with Canada's CBC Television, CBC Newsworld, CBC Radio CTV, and TSN. He has an extensive and varied career, that includes coverage of eight Olympics for TV, radio and web outlets. He has also written two books, produced a documentary on ski-racing and taught a graduate program in broadcast journalism at Sheridan College, outside Toronto.

The major sports events Connor has covered include: The 2010 Winter Olympic Winter Games in Vancouver and the 2008 Beijing Olympic Summer Games (for the IOC's Olympic News Channel) the 2004 Olympics in Athens (CBC Newsworld), the 2000 Sydney Olympics (CBC.ca), 1988 Olympics in Seoul (CBC Radio), the 1990 New Zealand Commonwealth Games, the Stanley Cup Finals, the World Series, the Super Bowl, the NBA Finals, etc..

For Al Jazeera English, he has profiled two-time NBA MVP Steve Nash as well as reporting on American football, ice hockey, curling, the U-S Open Tennis Championship, the 2007 Cricket World Cup, the 2007 America's Cup yacht racing, the 2007 Pan American Games in Brazil, the 2007 World Anti-Doping Conference in Madrid and the humanitarian sports group Right to Play. In 2008, he did stories on Turkish NBA star, Hedo Türkoğlu, covered the Davis Cup Tennis Finals in Argentina, reported from the Super Bowl in Phoenix, profiled Indycar Racing driver Danica Patrick, South Korean golfers on the LPGA Tour, and produced a series of pre-Olympic stories on athletes and teams headed to Beijing.

References

External links
 
 Profile at CTV News Northern Ontario
 Al Jazeera English biography

Canadian television sportscasters
Living people
People from Greater Sudbury
Curling broadcasters
Queen's University at Kingston alumni
Place of birth missing (living people)
Year of birth missing (living people)
CTV Television Network people